Valegro (born 5 July 2002) is a gelding ridden by the British equestrian Charlotte Dujardin in the sport of dressage. He stands  and has the stable name of Blueberry. He is a double World Champion in Dressage, he won Grand Prix Special and Grand Prix Freestyle at the World.

Career
Having joined Carl Hester's stable in Newent, Gloucestershire as a groom, Dujardin was offered the opportunity to develop the novice Dutch Warmblood gelding by Hester and co-owner Roly Luard, with the later intention of the horse being ridden in competition by Hester.

Valegro remained unbeaten since CDI Kapellen in January 2012.

The combination became part of the team which won gold in a European Dressage Championships event in Rotterdam. They then won the FEI World Cup grand prix at London Olympia in 2011, setting a world record for the Olympic grand prix special discipline scoring 88.022%, in April 2012.

Selected to represent Great Britain in the 2012 Summer Olympics, in the first round they set a new Olympic record of 83.784%. On 7 August 2012 the pair were members of the team which won the gold medal in the team dressage event. Two days later they won the gold in the individual dressage event with a score of 90.089%.

At the 2013 European Championships in Herning, Charlotte and Valegro won both the Grand Prix and the Grand Prix Special with 85.94% and 85.69%.

At Olympia 2013 he beat the Grand Prix Freestyle world record (by around 2%) he set the new record to 93.975% (the record was previously held by Edward Gal and Moorlands Totilas). At Olympia 2014 he improved his own Grand Prix Freestyle world record (94.3%) and his own Grand Prix world record (87.46%).

Valegro also achieved a gold medal in the individual dressage at the Rio 2016 Olympic Games with a score of 93.857%, and was an integral part of the Silver medal winning Team for Great Britain, at the same event. In 2016 Breyer released a model of Valegro.

Retirement
On 14 December 2016, Valegro and Charlotte Dujardin marked his retirement from competition with a performance given at the London International Horse Show 2016 and televised live by the BBC. It was followed by a farewell ceremony with Valegro's owners, and companions Charlotte Dujardin, Carl Hester and Alan Davies.

Breeding

Valegro is sired by the legendary KWPN stallion Negro, by Olympic Ferro.

Furioso II is his great great damsire.

See also
 List of historical horses

References 

Dressage horses
2002 animal births
Horses in the Olympics
Individual warmbloods